The combtooth dogfish (Centroscyllium nigrum) is a little-known, deepwater dogfish shark, named after its teeth that are comb-shaped.

Description
The combtooth dogfish has no anal fin, grooved dorsal spines, two dorsal fins of about same size, a pointed nose, large eyes, small gill slits, a short abdomen, a short caudal peduncle, and is blackish-brown in color with white-tipped fins. Like all dogfish sharks, it has 2 spines in front of its 2 dorsal fins. It grows to a maximum of 50cm. It has a faint tiger-like band held together by the lateral line that has photophores that emit light to attract prey. Immature pups are born at 11-13cm. It has a spiracle behind each eye.

Diet
It consists of eating small fish, shrimp, and cephalopods.

Habits and Habitat
It is an uncommon deepwater shark found close to the bottom between 400 and 1,145m. It is found in the eastern Pacific and around Hawaii.

References

 
 
 
 FAO Species Catalogue Volume 4 Parts 1 and 2 Sharks of the World

Centroscyllium
Taxa named by Samuel Garman
Fish described in 1899